The Afon Tarell is a river in Powys, Wales, which rises to the west of the Brecon Beacons in Brecon Beacons National Park and flows north, then north-east, for  into the River Usk.

The river is followed for its entire length through Glyn Tarell (the Tarell valley) by the A470 road, passing by the hamlets of Libanus and Tai'r Bull and entering the Usk at Llanfaes on the southern edge of Brecon.

The most significant tributary of the river is Nant Cwm Llwch, which enters the Tarell on its right bank between Tai'r Bull and Llanfaes. This secondary river emerges from the glacial lake of Llyn Cwm Llwch beneath Pen y Fan.

The name may have its origins in the old Welsh language words tarddu, "to bubble out", and tarddell, "a spring or source".

The Afon Tarell, in common with the Usk and its other tributaries, is designated as a special area of conservation for its three species of lamprey, twaite shad, European bullhead, Atlantic salmon and otter.

References

Tarell
Tarell
Tarell